Hubert Hüppe (born 3 November 1956) is a German politician, and MP from the Christian Democratic Union. He was elected to the Bundestag at the 2021 German federal election after serving previous terms in the 1990s, 2000s and 2010s.

References

External links
Bundestag profile

Living people
1956 births
20th-century German politicians
21st-century German politicians
Members of the Bundestag 1990–1994
Members of the Bundestag 1994–1998
Members of the Bundestag 1998–2002
Members of the Bundestag 2002–2005
Members of the Bundestag 2005–2009
Members of the Bundestag 2009–2013
Members of the Bundestag 2013–2017
Members of the Bundestag 2021–2025
Members of the Bundestag for the Christian Democratic Union of Germany
Members of the Bundestag for North Rhine-Westphalia
People from Lünen
German anti-abortion activists